I Met My Love Again is a 1938 American romantic drama film distributed by United Artists, directed by Joshua Logan, Arthur Ripley and George Cukor. The screenplay was written by David Hertz, based on the novel Summer Lightning by Allene Corliss. The film stars Joan Bennett and Henry Fonda.

Synopsis
The film begins with Julie and Ives, who are two teen sweethearts, on a walk together. They declare they love each other and want to get married as soon as Ives has earned enough money for them to live on.

The following Christmas, Julie is out in town with her friend, buying provisions for a Christmas party. Although there is a blizzard, the girls wager on who can reach home first; Julie takes the mountain road. She gets lost in the storm and her family and Ives begin to panic. She finds a small cottage, rented by pulp fiction writer Michael Shaw. He seduces her and the next morning they marry and elope to Paris.

Ten unhappy years pass for Julie and Ives. When Michael is shot in a brawl, Julie returns to her hometown with her daughter, Michael. Ives has become a college professor and the two meet curtly. One of Ives' students, Brenda Lane, has developed a massive crush on her teacher, and professes her love for him. Brenda uses almost the exact words Ives used to Julie ten years previously when she describes her love for him, and suddenly he realizes he still loves Julie. He rejects Brenda and invites Julie to the school prom with him.

During the evening, they find their love has re-blossomed, but it is ruined when Brenda makes a scene. Someone takes Brenda home and Julie and Ives decide to leave, but they also decide to get married as soon as possible.

When they arrive home, a man arrives with Brenda claiming she tried to hang herself after the party. Ives declares he can't marry Julie if Brenda is prepared to die for love of him. Julie, distraught, rushes out to the car where Brenda is waiting and begins to drive it at high speeds, claiming she is going to kill them both as neither of them can have Ives. Brenda begs her not to do it, claiming she didn't really try to kill herself, and only pretended to do so to get Ives back for rejecting her.

Julie and Ives get married at long last.

Cast

Production
The film was known as Carelessly.

Reception
The film didn't make a profit, but lost $64,104.

Holt and Fonda reprised their roles on a radio dramatisation of the film on Hollywood Hotel.

References

External links
 
 
 
 

1938 films
American romantic drama films
American black-and-white films
Films directed by Joshua Logan
Films directed by Arthur Ripley
Films directed by George Cukor 
Films based on American novels
United Artists films
Films produced by Walter Wanger
Films scored by Heinz Roemheld
1938 romantic drama films
1938 directorial debut films
1930s English-language films
1930s American films